Arthur Davenport may refer to:

 Chaka Fattah (Arthur Davenport, born 1956), former U.S. representative for Pennsylvania
 Arthur Davenport (aeronautical engineer) (1891–1976), British aircraft engineer
 Arthur Davenport (electrical engineer) (1901–1973), New Zealand electrical engineer and electricity administrator